Echovenator ("echolocation hunter") is a genus of primitive odontocete from late Oligocene (Chattian) marine deposits in South Carolina belonging to Xenorophidae.

Description and paleobiology
Echovenator is distinguishable from other xenorophids in having a paranaris fossa and fused fronto-nasal and maxillo-premaxillary sutures. The earbone structure shows that this odontocete was clearly capable of echolocation.

References

Oligocene cetaceans
Fossil taxa described in 2016